Charles, Hereditary Prince of Mecklenburg-Güstrow (18 November 1664 in Güstrow – 15 March 1688 in Güstrow) was the hereditary prince of Mecklenburg-Güstrow.  He was a son of Gustavus Adolph and his wife Magdalene Sibylle née Duchess of Schleswig-Holstein-Gottorp, a daughter of Frederick III.

Life 
Charles married on 10 August 1687 in Potsdam to Marie Amalie of Brandenburg, the daughter of the "Great Elector" Frederick William of Brandenburg.  The marriage remained childless.  He died unexpectedly of smallpox.  He was the last surviving son of his father, and his wife lost her child when she learned of his fate, so that the Mecklenburg-Güstrow line died out when his father died in 1695.

His brother-in-law, Duke Adolf Frederick II of Mecklenburg-Strelitz claimed Mecklenburg-Güstrow.  However Duke Frederick William of Mecklenburg-Schwerin disagreed and the legal situation was unclear, leading to a long succession dispute.  The dispute was settled in the Partition of Hamburg, in which the relationship between Mecklenburg-Schwerin and Mecklenburg-Strelitz was redefined and Mecklenburg-Güstrow was given to Mecklenburg-Schwerin.

External links 
 
 
 Stammtafel des Hauses Mecklenburg

Dukes of Mecklenburg-Güstrow
House of Mecklenburg
People from Güstrow
1664 births
1688 deaths
17th-century German people
Heirs apparent who never acceded
Sons of monarchs